The 1991 Braintree District Council election took place on 2 May 1991 to elect members of Braintree District Council in England. This was on the same day as other local elections.

Summary

Election result

Ward results

Black Notley

Bocking North

Bocking South

Braintree Central

Braintree East

Braintree West

Bumpstead

Castle Headingham

Coggeshall

Colne Engaine & Greenstead Green

Cressing

Earls Colne

Gosfield

Halstead Holy Trinity

Halstead St. Andrew's

Hatfield Peverel

Kelvedon

Panfield

Rayne

Sible Headingham

Stour Valley Central

Stour Valley North

Stour Valley South

Terling

Three Fields

Upper Colne

Witham Central

Witham Chipping Hill

Witham North

Witham Silver End & Rivenhall

Witham South

Witham West

Yeldham

References

Braintree District Council elections
1991 English local elections
May 1991 events in the United Kingdom
1990s in Essex